Clambus pubescens is a species of minute beetle in the family Clambidae. It is found in Europe and Northern Asia (excluding China) and North America.

References

Further reading

 

Scirtoidea
Articles created by Qbugbot
Beetles described in 1849